Elections were held in the Australian state of Queensland on 11 May 1929 to elect the 72 members of the state's Legislative Assembly. In this election, Irene Longman became the first woman to both stand and be elected into the Queensland Parliament.

The Labor government was seeking its sixth continuous term in office since the 1915 election; it would be Premier William McCormack's second election. His main opponent was the Country and Progressive National Party (CPNP), led by Arthur Edward Moore. The term had not gone well for McCormack's government, including a railway lock-out in 1927 which pitted the Labor Party against the union movement, restrictive financial policies and attempts to sell off state-owned enterprises, as well as suggestions of corruption which later came to be known as the Mungana affair.

The election resulted in the defeat of the McCormack government, and the first non-Labor ministry since 1915.

Key dates

Results

The election saw the defeat of the Labor government by the CPNP.

|}

 517,466 electors were enrolled to vote at the election, but 4 seats (5.6% of the total) were uncontested—2 Labor seats (3 less than 1926) representing 9,041 enrolled voters and two CPNP seats (one more than 1926) representing 16,536 enrolled voters.

Seats changing party representation

This table lists changes in party representation at the 1929 election.

Aftermath
The CPNP found itself in power as the Great Depression took hold. It lost power after one term.

See also
 Candidates of the Queensland state election, 1929
 Members of the Queensland Legislative Assembly, 1926–1929
 Members of the Queensland Legislative Assembly, 1929–1932
 McCormack Ministry
 Moore Ministry (Queensland)

References

Elections in Queensland
1929 elections in Australia
1920s in Queensland
May 1929 events